Jacob Ralph "Jacq" van den Berg (born 19 December 1916) is a sailor from the Netherlands who represented his country at the 1960 Summer Olympics in Naples. He was born in Birmingham. Van den Berg, as crew on the Dutch Dragon, took the 13th place with helmsman Wim van Duyl and fellow crew member Biem Dudok van Heel. In the 1956 Olympics in Melbourne Van den Berg was the Dragon crew for the Dutch Olympic team. After the Soviet invasion in Hungary, however, the Dutch government decided that the Dutch Olympic team would not compete.

References

External links
 
 
 

Possibly living people
1916 births
Sportspeople from Birmingham, West Midlands
Dutch male sailors (sport)
Sailors at the 1960 Summer Olympics – Dragon
Olympic sailors of the Netherlands
20th-century Dutch people